Tingler may refer to:

 Tingler (surname), multiple people
 The Tingler (film), a 1959 horror film starring Vincent Price
 Tingler (fictional character), a character from the stop motion film The Life and Adventures of Santa Claus (1985 film)
 "The Tingler", a 1991 song by the Future Sound of London from the Pulse 3 EP
 "The Tingler", a 1991 song by Severed Heads from the album Cuisine (With Piscatorial)
 "The Tingler", a 2003 song by Blondie from the album The Curse of Blondie
 The Tingler, a brand name for a head massager
 Project Tingler, a dating sim by Zoe Quinn and Chuck Tingle

See also

 Tingling
 Tingly
 
 
 Tingle (disambiguation)